Samuel Starks House is a historic home located at Charleston, West Virginia.

It is an American Foursquare style home built in 1908, as home for Samuel W. Starks (1866–1908). Starks was a nationally prominent African American leader in the Knights of Pythias fraternal organization.

It was severely damaged by a fire in 1981 and subsequently repaired and renovated. The Samuel Starks House was listed on the National Register of Historic Places in 1988.

See also
 List of Knights of Pythias buildings
 National Register of Historic Places listings in Kanawha County, West Virginia

References

Houses in Charleston, West Virginia
African-American history of West Virginia
Clubhouses in West Virginia
Knights of Pythias buildings
Houses completed in 1908
Houses on the National Register of Historic Places in West Virginia
National Register of Historic Places in Charleston, West Virginia
American Foursquare architecture in West Virginia
1908 establishments in West Virginia